Thomas George Eason (16 December 1908 – 21 January 1977) was an Australian rules footballer who played with Footscray in the Victorian Football League (VFL).

He later served in the Royal Australian Air Force during World War II.

Notes

External links 

1908 births
1977 deaths
Australian rules footballers from Victoria (Australia)
Western Bulldogs players